Rose Plumer (January 19, 1876, California – March 3, 1955, Hollywood, California) was an American actress. She married actor Lincoln Plumer.

Selected filmography
 The Family Secret (1924)
 Outside the Law (1930)
 A House Divided (1931)
 Law of the West (1932)
 The Bowery (1933)
The Brand of Hate (1934)
 Circumstantial Evidence (1935)
 Inside the Law (1942)
 Bullets and Saddles (1943)
 Marshal of Reno (1944)
 Dark Mountain (1944)
 Phantom of the Plains (1945)
 The Madonna's Secret (1946)

References

External links

Actresses from California
American silent film actresses
1876 births
1955 deaths
20th-century American actresses
Actresses from Fresno, California